The Belgian Elite League is the top flight men's competition for rugby union in Belgium.

Teams 

As of the 2018/19 season The Elite League has eight teams:
 ASUB Waterloo
 Boitsfort RC
 Kituro Schaarbeek RC
 RC Frameries
 Dendermonde Rugby Club
 RC Soignies
 Roc Ottignies
 RC La Hulpe

The 2018/19 Champions were RC La Hulpe. In 2018 RFC Liégeois was relegated having finished bottom of the Elite League and RC Frameries were promoted from the 2nd Division.

Champions 
 
1937 : Antwerp British Sport Club
1938 : Royal Beerschot AC
1939 : RSCAnderlecht-Rugby
1946 : RSCAnderlecht-Rugby
1947 : RSCAnderlecht-Rugby
1948 : RSCAnderlecht-Rugby
1949 : RSCAnderlecht-Rugby
1950 : RSCAnderlecht-Rugby
1951 : RSCAnderlecht-Rugby
1952 : RSCAnderlecht-Rugby
1953 : RSCAnderlecht-Rugby
1954 : RSCAnderlecht-Rugby
1955 : RSCAnderlecht-Rugby
1956 : RSCAnderlecht-Rugby
1957 : Racing Jet Bruxelles
1958 : RSCAnderlecht-Rugby
1959 : RSCAnderlecht-Rugby
1960 : Racing Jet Bruxelles
1961 : Racing Jet Bruxelles
1962 : Racing Jet Bruxelles
1963 : ASUB Waterloo
1964 : RSCAnderlecht-Rugby
1965 : ASUB Waterloo
1966 : RSCAnderlecht-Rugby
1967 : Kituro Schaerbeek RC
1968 : ASUB Waterloo
1969 : ASUB Waterloo
1970 : RSCAnderlecht-Rugby
1971 : RSCAnderlecht-Rugby
1972 : RSCAnderlecht-Rugby
1973 : BUC Saint-Josse RC
1974 : RSCAnderlecht-Rugby
1975 : Coq Mosan
1976 : Coq Mosan
1977 : Coq Mosan
1978 : ASUB Waterloo
1979 : ASUB Waterloo
1980 : ASUB Waterloo
1981 : Coq Mosan
1982 : Coq Mosan
1983 : Coq Mosan
1984 : ASUB Waterloo
1985 : Brussels British
1986 : ASUB Waterloo
1987 : ASUB Waterloo
1988 : ASUB Waterloo
1989 : ASUB Waterloo
1990 : Boitsfort RC
1991 : Boitsfort RC
1992 : Boitsfort RC
1993 : Boitsfort RC
1994 : ASUB Waterloo
1995 : Boitsfort RC
1996 : Kituro Schaerbeek RC
1997 : Boitsfort RC
1998 : ASUB Waterloo
1999 : Boitsfort RC
2000 : RC Visé
2001 : Boitsfort RC
2002 : Boitsfort RC
2003 : Boitsfort RC
2004 : Boitsfort RC
2005 : Boitsfort RC
2006 : Boitsfort RC
2006-07 : Boitsfort RC
2007-08 : Boitsfort RC
2008-09 : Kituro Schaerbeek RC
2009-10 : Boitsfort RC
2010-11 : Kituro Schaerbeek RC
2011-12 : Dendermondse RC
2012-13 : ASUB Waterloo
2013-14 : ASUB Waterloo
2014-15 : Kituro Schaerbeek RC
2015-16 : Dendermondse RC
2016-17 : Dendermondse RC
2017-18 : Dendermondse RC
2018-19 : Rugby Club La Hulpe

See also 
 Belgian Rugby Federation
 Rugby union in Belgium
 Brussels Barbarians

External links
 Belgian Rugby Federation - Official Site

 
 
National rugby union premier leagues
Rugby union leagues in Europe
rugby union
1937 establishments in Belgium
Sports leagues established in 1937